Thomas Paul Fussell (born May 25, 1945) is a former professional American football player. He played as a defensive end for the Boston Patriots in the American Football League for one season, in 1967. He played in 12 games that season, starting in two. He attended Louisiana State University, where he played college football for the LSU Tigers football team. Following his senior season at LSU, he was invited to play in the 1966 East–West Shrine Game.

Fussell was born in Cleveland, Ohio and attended Istrouma High School in Baton Rouge, Louisiana.

References

1945 births
Living people
Players of American football from Cleveland
LSU Tigers football players
Boston Patriots players
American football defensive ends
American Football League players